2005 was marked by a greatest success in the Russian club football so far, as CSKA Moscow won the UEFA Cup. Later, CSKA completed the treble, winning the Russian Cup and the Russian Premier League title. Notable changes in the Russian Football Union also took place.

Changes in the Russian Football Union
On 2 April, Vitaliy Mutko was elected new president of the Russian Football Union to succeed Vyacheslav Koloskov. Two days later, national team coach Georgi Yartsev resigned and was replaced by Yuri Semin. However, Semin stepped down on 10 November, after Russia failed to qualify for the 2006 World Cup.

National team
The Russia national team attempted to qualify for the 2006 FIFA World Cup via European qualifying group 3. A scoreless draw in Bratislava against Slovakia on 12 October, the final group match for both teams, ended Russia's hopes of qualifying for Germany. Portugal won the group and automatically qualified for the finals. Russia and Slovakia finished level on points for second place and a place in the UEFA playoffs; Slovakia won the tiebreaker on overall goal difference in the group. A Russia win in the final match would have sent Russia to the playoffs at Slovakia's expense.

 Russia score given first

Key
 H = Home match
 A = Away match
 F = Friendly
 WCQ = 2006 FIFA World Cup Qualifying, Group 3

U-21 team
The U-21 team contested the qualification for the 2006 U-21 Championship. They finished second in the group, overcoming Slovakia on head-to-head results, while Portugal were first. This allowed Russia to qualify for the play-off against Denmark.

Russia lost both play-off matches, 0–1 in Moscow on 12 November and 1–3 in Brøndby on 18 November. In the second-leg match, five Russia players were sent off.

Women's U-19 team
The women's under-19 team won the European Championship in Hungary. They have finished second in the group stage after matches against France, England, and Scotland. In the semifinal they overcame Germany 3–1, thanks to the hat-trick by captain Elena Danilova, and the final match against France ended 2–2 after extra time and 6–5 on penalties.

Leagues

Premier League

First Division

Yevgeny Alkhimov of Lokomotiv became the top scorer with 24 goals.

Second Division
The following clubs have earned promotion by winning tournaments in their respective Second Division zones:
 FC Baltika Kaliningrad (West)
 FC Salyut-Energiya Belgorod (Centre)
 FC Angusht Nazran (South)
 FC Sodovik Sterlitamak (Ural-Povolzhye)
 FC Metallurg Krasnoyarsk (East)

Russian Cup
Defending Russian Cup holders Terek Grozny were knocked out by their first opponents, Amkar Perm. For the second year in a row, the First Division side was present in the final, this time FC Khimki. But unlike the 2004, the final match was won 1–0 by the Premier League club, CSKA Moscow. CSKA lost the first-leg match 2–0 to their first opponents, Sokol Saratov, and progressed thanks to an awarded 3–0 victory after Sokol failed to show for the second leg.

UEFA club competitions

2004–05 UEFA Cup
Only CSKA Moscow qualified for the spring phase of the UEFA Cup 2004–05. They successively defeated Benfica, Partizan Belgrade, Auxerre, and Parma to reach the final. In the final match played in Lisbon, CSKA defeated Sporting Clube de Portugal 3–1 to become the first ever Russian club to win any major European competition.

UEFA Super Cup
CSKA Moscow lost the European Super Cup match 3–1 to Liverpool F.C., the UEFA Champions League title holders.

UEFA Champions League 2005–06
Lokomotiv Moscow, the only Russian side to participate in the UEFA Champions League 2005–06, defeated FK Rabotnički in the second qualifying round, but were knocked out by Rapid Vienna in the third qualifying round. Along with the other losers in the third qualifying round, Lokomotiv entered the UEFA Cup at the first round proper.

2005–06 UEFA Cup
CSKA Moscow, Lokomotiv Moscow, and Zenit Saint Petersburg have qualified for the group stage of the UEFA Cup 2005–06. Krylya Sovetov Samara have successfully passed the second qualifying round, but were knocked out in the first round proper by AZ Alkmaar.

Zenit and Lokomotiv qualified for the Round of 32. CSKA finished fourth in the group and thus failed to defend their title.

References

 
Seasons in Russian football